The following is a list of Soviet military equipment of World War II which includes firearms, artillery, vehicles, aircraft and warships. World War II was the deadliest war in history which started in 1939 and ended in 1945. Following political instability built-up in Europe from 1930, Nazi Germany, which aimed to dominate Europe, attacked Poland on 1 September 1939 marking the official start of World War II. The USSR (Soviet Union) used Poland as a buffer from Germany from 17 September 1939, when the Polish state and its government actually ceased to exist. Germany with its allies attacked the USSR on 22 June 1941, and the country lost 26.6 million people during four years of the Great Patriotic war. The war in Europe ended on 7 May 1945 with the capitulation of Germany to the allied (including Soviet) forces. About 80-90% of losses during the entire war the German armed forces suffered on the Soviet (Eastern) front, whose contribution to the victory was decisive. By the end of the war, the Soviet Union produced 30.3 million rifles; 1,476 million machine guns; 516,648 artillery guns; 347,900 mortars; 119,769 tanks and self-propelled guns; 265,600 army trucks; 213,742 military aircraft; 2 cruisers; 25 destroyers; 52 submarines.

Helmets

Body Armour

Knives

Small arms

Revolvers and pistols

Rifles, sniper rifles and battle rifles

Submachine guns

Machine guns

Explosives, hand-held anti-tank and incendiary weapons

Grenades and grenade launchers

Mines

Recoilless rifles

Infantry anti-tank rifles and rocket launchers

Flamethrowers and anti-tank incendiaries

Artillery

Light and heavy infantry mortars

Rocket launchers

Vehicular guns

Field artillery

Fortress and siege guns

Anti-tank guns

Ground-based anti-aircraft weapons

Light anti-aircraft guns

Heavy anti-aircraft guns

Armored fighting vehicles

Tankettes

Tanks

Self-propelled guns

Wheeled anti-tank self-propelled guns

Tracked anti-aircraft guns

Armoured cars

Half-tracks

Improvised armoured fighting vehicles

Armoured trains

Lend-Lease tanks and SPGs

Motor vehicles

Trucks

Passenger/utility vehicles

Lend-Lease vehicles

Motorcycles

Tractors & prime movers

Engineering and command

Miscellaneous vehicles

Aircraft

Fighter aircraft

Navy ships

List of ships of the Second World War

Rockets and bombs
RS-82 (rocket family)

See also

 List of World War II weapons
 List of military vehicles of World War II
 List of British military equipment of World War II
 List of equipment of the United States Army during World War II
 List of German military equipment of World War II
 List of Italian Army equipment in World War II
 List of Japanese military equipment of World War II

References

 
World War II equipment
Soviet Union
Soviet Union